Buruguduystunstugudunstuy is an album by the Filipino alternative rock band Parokya Ni Edgar, released in 1997 by Universal Records. It is the band's second album.

Track listing

Album credits
Executive Producer: Bella Tan
Engineered/Mixed/Digitally Enhanced by: Angee Rozul (with the help of Yordi & Elmer)
Album Cover Concept and Illustration: Chito Miranda and Ian Sta. Maria
Art Direction and Lay out: Grahic Axcess, Inc

References

External links
Buruguduystunstugudunstuy Track List

1997 albums
Parokya ni Edgar albums
Universal Records (Philippines) albums